is a city located in Aichi Prefecture, Japan. , the city had an estimated population of 386,999 in 164,087 households, and a population density of 999 persons per km².

Geography
Okazaki is in the coastal plains of southeastern Aichi Prefecture. The ground rises to undulating hills in the former Nukata area to the northeast. About 60 percent of the city area is forested and remains sparsely populated.

Climate
The city has a climate characterized by hot and humid summers, and relatively mild winters (Köppen climate classification Cfa).

Demographics
Per Japanese census data, the population of Okazaki has grown steadily over the past 60 years.  This fast population growth reflects the low unemployment rate, as well as affordable housing close to Nagoya. Of the total population, in November 2019 there were 12,581 are foreign nationals (2.92% of the total, compared with the nationwide average of 1.55%). There are 6,148 foreign males and 6,433 foreign females with a total of 6990 households. Including those registered as stateless, the foreign population comes from 71 nationalities, though more than half are from Brazil. Other significant foreign communities include Koreans, Chinese and Filipinos.

Surrounding municipalities
Aichi Prefecture
Toyokawa
Shinshiro
Toyota
Nishio
Kōta
Anjō
Gamagōri

Cityscape

History

Origins
The area around present-day Okazaki has been inhabited for many thousands of years. Archaeologists have found remains from the Japanese Paleolithic period.
Numerous remains from the Jōmon period, and especially from the Yayoi and Kofun periods, have been found, including many kofun burial mounds.

Sengoku period
During the Sengoku period, the area was controlled by the Matsudaira clan, a branch of which later rose to prominence as the Tokugawa clan, who ruled Japan during the Edo period.

Edo period
During this time, Okazaki Domain, a feudal han was established to rule the immediate area around Okazaki and was entrusted to a fudai daimyō.
Several smaller domains were in the present-day city limits, including Fukozu (later Mikawa-Nakajima), Okudono Domain and Nishi-Ohira Domain. The town prospered as a post station on the Tōkaidō connecting Edo with Kyoto.

Meiji period
Following the Meiji Restoration, the modern town of Okazaki was established on October 1, 1889 with the establishment of the modern municipalities system in Nukata District of Aichi Prefecture. On October 1, 1914, Okazaki annexed neighboring Hirohata Town. Okazaki was proclaimed a city on July 1, 1916.

The city suffered damage in both the 1944 Tōnankai earthquake (which killed 9 people) and the 1945 Mikawa earthquake (which killed 29 people). During World War II, the July 19, 1945 Bombing of Okazaki killed over 200 people and destroyed most of the city center. Although Okazaki was the location of an Imperial Japanese Navy airfield, military installations were not damaged in the attack.

Modern Okazaki
In 1955, through a series of mergers and consolidations, the area of Okazaki expanded considerably. The former towns of Iwazu, Fukuoka, and Yahagi, and the villages of Motojuku, Yamanaka, Kawai, Fujikawa, and Ryugai were all merged into Okazaki. The 1959 Isewan Typhoon caused considerable damage, and killed 27 residents. On October 15, 1962, Okazaki annexed the neighboring town of Mutsumi.

Okazaki was proclaimed a core city on April 1, 2003, with increased autonomy from the prefectural government. On January 1, 2006, the town of Nukata (from Nukata District) was merged into Okazaki.

Government

Mayor-council
Okazaki has a mayor-council form of government with a directly elected mayor and a unicameral city legislature of 37 members.

Prefectural Assembly
The city contributes five members to the Aichi Prefectural Assembly.

House of Representatives
In terms of national politics, the city is part of Aichi District 12 of the lower house of the Diet of Japan.

Public

Police
Aichi Prefectural Police
Okazaki police station

Firefighting
Okazaki Fire department
Okazaki-Naka fire department
Okazaki-Higashi fire department
Okazaki-Nishi fire department

Health care
Hospital
Aichi Prefectural Hospital
Okazaki City Hospital

Post office
Okazaki Post office

Library
Okazaki City Library

International relations

Twin towns/sister cities
Newport Beach（California, United States）- Since November 1984
Uddevalla（Sweden）- since September 1968
Hohhot（Inner Mongolia, China）- since August 1987

Economy

Okazaki was noted in the Meiji period as a centre for textiles and commerce and the production of miso; modern Okazaki is a hub for the chemical and machinery industries.

Primary sector of the economy

Agriculture
Konjac
Miso
Tea
Japan Agricultural Cooperatives
JA Aichi Mikawa

Forestry
Cryptomeria
Chamaecyparis obtusa
Forest Association
Okazaki Forest Association

Secondary sector of the economy
The area has historically been one of the main centres of the production of stone tōrō (Japanese lanterns). The traditional stonemasonry there was registered by the government as a Japanese craft in 1979.
Mitsubishi Motors Okazaki Factory

Tertiary sector of the economy
Shopping center
APiTA Okazaki-Kita
Æon Mall Okazaki
Æon Town Okazaki-Miai
Com Town
EruEru Town
Luvit Park
Okazaki CIBICO
Oto Riverside Terrace
Resupa
Wing Town

Education

Universities and colleges
 National Institutes of Natural Sciences
 National Institute for Physiological Sciences
 National Institute for Basic Biology
 Aichi Gakusen University
 Aichi Gakusen College
 Aichi Sangyo University
 University of Human Environments
 Okazaki Women's Junior College
 Yamasa Institute

Primary and secondary schools
Okazaki has 48 public elementary schools and 21 public junior high schools operated by the city government, and one private middle school. The city has seven public high schools operated by the Aichi Prefectural Board of Education and four private high schools, including the Hikarigaoka Girls' High School. The prefecture also operates four special education schools for the handicapped, and the national government operates one special education school as well.

The city formerly housed the Escola São Paulo, a Brazilian international school.

Transportation

Railway

Highspeed rail
The Tōkaidō Shinkansen passes through Okazaki city limits but does not stop.

Conventional lines
Central Japan Railway Company
Tōkaidō Main Line：  
Meitetsu
Nagoya Line：               
Aichi Loop Line Co Ltd
Aichi Loop Line：

Roads

Highways
 Tōmei Expressway (Asian Highway Network AH1)
Shin-Tōmei Expressway

Japan National Route

Local attractions

Okazaki Castle 
Okazaki Castle was originally built in 1455. Captured by the Matsudaira clan in 1524 (and probably relocated from the other side of the river), the castle remains associated with Tokugawa Ieyasu, even though the latter transferred to Edo in 1590. During the Edo period it served as the seat of the Okazaki Domain and dominated the city until the Meiji Restoration.

Fireworks 
Okazaki is famous for its fireworks. The Tokugawa shogunate restricted production of gunpowder outside of the immediate region of Okazaki (with few exceptions). Even today, more than 70% of Japan's fireworks are designed and manufactured here. A large fireworks festival, which people from all over Japan come to see, is held annually on the first Saturday in August in the area surrounding Okazaki Castle.

Hatchō miso 
Hatchō miso (八丁味噌) is a dark miso paste made using a process of steaming soybeans (instead of boiling) followed by maturation in cedar barrels under the weight of 3 tons of carefully stacked river stones for at least 2 years. Located 8 chō (hatchō, or approximately 900m) west of Okazaki Castle near the Yahagi river, there are two 8-cho miso companies — Maruya from 1337 and Kakukyu.

The old tiled buildings are heritage listed and Kaku has been a family business for 18 generations. It is one of the most famous miso producers in Japan, supplying the Emperor by appointment, and popular as a health food. 2006 NHK morning drama serial, Junjo Kirari (Sparkling Innocence) was largely filmed in and around the Hatchō miso grounds. Tours are available every 30 minutes and free samples are provided. Hatchō miso's health properties are considered so great that it was donated to Chernobyl's citizens following the disaster, to help prevent and treat radiation sickness.

Takisan 
The Buddhist temple of Takisan-ji (7th century) includes several Important Cultural Properties of Japan. The main hall is from the Kamakura period and is the location of a fire festival held each February on the closest Saturday to the lunar calendar New Year. The distinctive Sanmon gate and the main image are designated as important cultural properties. Adjoining the temple is Takisan Tōshō-gū, a Shinto Shrine built in 1646 by Tokugawa Iemitsu.

Culture

Language 
While the local Mikawa dialect is considered to be generally indistinguishable from what is considered modern standard Japanese, there are subtle and distinctive differences. Mikawa dialect has, on the other hand, substantial differences when compared to the dialect of Nagoya and western areas of Aichi, where the Nagoya dialect (also known as Owari-ben, Owari being the traditional name for the Nagoya region) is the traditional dialect. Cognitively Mikawa-ben and modern contemporary Japanese are extremely close, in part due to the influence of the Tokugawa shogunate and accidents of history. In recent decades a large number of people moving into Okazaki and the surrounding cities (particularly to work in the motor vehicle industry) and mass media have influenced the local dialect, with the result that in day-to-day life more people are using only standard Japanese.

Notable people from Okazaki
Takako Okamura, singer-songwriter
Yuki Fukaya, professional soccer player
Naoko Fukazu, professional women's table tennis player
Sei Hiraizumi, actor
Kotaro Honda, scientist, metallurgist
Yuko Kawai, pianist
Motoo Kimura, biologist
Takashi Kondō, voice actor
Takeshi Nagata, geophysicist
Immi, musician
Kotomitsuki Keiji, sumo wrestler
Ryo Miyaichi, professional soccer player
Daisuke Nakajima, race car driver
Satoru Nakajima, race car driver
Kazuki Nakajima, race car driver
Masamitsu Naito , politician
Hitoshi Ogawa, race car driver
Takahiro Sakurai, voice actor
Yasuo Segawa, illustrator
Shiga Shigetaka, geographer
Seiken Sugiura, politician
Nozomi Takeuchi, gravure idol
Yumiko Tsuzuki, professional women's volleyball player
Hiromasa Yamamoto, professional soccer player
Yūki Ishikawa, professional men's volleyball player
Yasunobu Okada, professor, National Institute for Physiological Sciences (NIPS).

References

External links 

   (with link to English pages)
 Okazaki International Association website

 
Brazilian communities
Cities in Aichi Prefecture